Cosmopterix flavidella is a moth of the family Cosmopterigidae. It is found on the islands of Honshu and Kyushu in Japan, and in Taiwan and Jiangxi, China.

The length of the forewings is 4–6 mm. The forewings are olive-fuscous and the hindwings are pale grey. Adults have been recorded on wing in April, March and October in Okinawa and from May to August in Honshu.

The larvae feed on Saccharum kanashiroi.

Etymology
The species name refers to the yellowish postmedian band and is derived from Latin flavus (meaning golden yellow).

References

Moths described in 2011
flavidella